

Australia
 Australian Army
 1st Armoured Regiment:  (Latin for "prepared")
 1st Commando Regiment: Strike swiftly
 1st/15th Royal New South Wales Lancers:  (Latin for "steadfast in faith")
 2nd Cavalry Regiment: Courage
 2nd Commando Regiment:  (Latin for "without warning")
 3rd/9th Light Horse (South Australian Mounted Rifles):  (Latin for "not afraid of difficulties")
 4th/19th Prince of Wales's Light Horse:  (German for "I serve")
 51st Battalion, Far North Queensland Regiment:  (Latin for "love of country leads me")
 Royal Australian Artillery:  (Latin for "where right and glory lead")
 Special Operations Engineer Regiment:  (Latin for "between spears and enemies")
 Royal Australian Regiment: Duty first
 Royal Queensland Regiment:  (Latin for "for altars and hearths")
 Royal Tasmania Regiment:  (Latin for "for altars and hearths")
 Special Air Service Regiment: Who dares wins
Royal Australian Air Force:  (Latin for "through adversity to the stars")
 No. 41 Wing: Pass not unseen
 No. 42 Wing: Defend from above
 No. 44 Wing: Steadfastness
 No. 78 Wing: Fight
 No. 81 Wing: Prepared to fight
 No. 82 Wing: Find and destroy
 No. 84 Wing: Guide and deliver
 No. 86 Wing: Precision
 No. 92 Wing: Watch and ward
 No. 395 Wing: Expeditionary support
 No. 396 Wing: Steadfast in support
 Royal Australian Navy: To fight and win at sea
 Clearance Diving Branch: United and undaunted
 Fleet Air Arm: Unrivalled
 Submarine Service: Silent service

Austria
 Bundesheer (Austrian Army): Schutz und Hilfe (German for ''Protection and help'')
Jägerbataillon 26:  (German for "Carinthians always ahead")
 Jagdkommando:  (Latin for "Never back down")
 Jägerbataillon 25 Airborne: "" (German for "Brave Bravely Faithful")
Jägerbataillon 23: In Treue fest (German for ''Steadfast in loyalty'')
Jägerbataillon 18: Das Oberland- Fest in uns'rer Hand! (German for ''The Highlands- Firmly in our hand'')
 Pionierbataillon 3: Pioniere - wie immer  (German for "Pioneers - like always")

Brunei Darussalam
Brunei Darussalam Commando Unit (RPK)
The Rejimen Pasukan Khas's motto is: "Tangkas Berani" or in English: "Agile and Brave"

Bangladesh
 Bangladesh Armed Forces:  (Bengali for "Ever High is My Head")
 Bengali Army:  (Bengali for "In War, In Peace We are Everywhere for our Country")
 Bengali Navy:  (Bengali for "In War and Peace Invincible at Sea")
 Bengali Air Force:  (Bengali for "Free shall we keep the sky of Bengal")
 Bengali Coast Guard:  (Bengali for "Guardian at Sea")

Brazil
Corpo de Fuzileiros Navais (Brazilian Marine Corps): Ad sumus (Latin for "here we are")
Grupamento de Mergulhadores de Combate: (Brazilian Navy Combat Diver): Fortuna Audaces Sequitur (Latin for "luck follow the brave")
1º Batalhão de Ações de Comandos: (1° Commando Action Battalion):Maximo de confusão, morte e destruição na retaguarda do inimigo (Portuguese for " Maximum of confusion, death and destruction behind the enemy lines")
1º Batalhão de Forças Especiais: (1º Special Forces Battalion): O Ideal como Motivação; A Abnegação como Rotina; O Perigo como Irmão e A Morte como Companheira (Portuguese for " The Ideal as Motivation; Self-denial as routine; Danger as a Brother and Death as a Companion.")
Batalhão de Operações Policiais Especiais (PMERJ): (Special Police Operations Battalion): Missão dada é missão cumprida (Portuguese for " A mission given is an accomplished mission")
Comando de Operações Táticas: (Tactical Operations Command): Em qualquer hora, em qualquer lugar para qualquer missão (Portuguese for "At anytime, anywhere for any mission")

Canada 
 Canadian Army:  (Latin for "we stand on guard for thee")
 1 Canadian Mechanized Brigade Group:  (Latin for "always vigilant")
 Lord Strathcona's Horse (Royal Canadians): Perseverance
 2 Canadian Mechanized Brigade Group:  (Latin for "strength and courage")
 The Royal Canadian Dragoons:  (Latin for "bold and swift")
 The Royal Canadian Regiment:  (Latin for "for country")
 5 Canadian Mechanized Brigade Group:  (French for "let's go")
  (12th Canadian Armoured Regiment):  (Latin for "I am present")
 Royal 22nd Regiment:  (French for "I remember")
 31 Canadian Brigade Group:  (Latin for "for hearth and home")
 The Royal Canadian Regiment:  (Latin for "for country")
 32 Canadian Brigade Group: Steadfast
 33 Canadian Brigade Group:  (Latin for "strong alone, stronger together")
 34 Canadian Brigade Group:  (French for "fight, overcome or die")
 Royal 22nd Regiment:  (French for "I remember")
 38 Canadian Brigade Group:  (Latin for "ever forward, never back")
 39 Canadian Brigade Group:  (Latin for "splendor without diminishment")
 41 Canadian Brigade Group: Fortune favours the bold
Hastings & Prince Edward Regiment: Paratus (Latin for "prepared")
 Royal Canadian Air Force:  (Latin for "such is the pathway to the stars")
 Royal Canadian Navy: Ready aye ready
 Canadian Joint Operations Command:  (Latin for "united in purpose")
 Canadian Special Operations Forces Command:  (Latin for "we will find a way")
 427 Special Operations Aviation Squadron:  (Latin for "strike with a sure hand")
 Canadian Joint Incident Response Unit:  (Latin for "never unprepared")
 Canadian Special Operations Regiment:  (Latin for "we dare")
 Joint Task Force 2:  (Latin for "deeds, not words")

Chile
 Chilean Army:  (Spanish for "Always Victorious, Never Defeated")

China, Republic of
Republic of China Armed Force
防衛固守，有效嚇阻(fang-wei-gu-shou, you-xiao-he-zu): persistent defense, effective intimidation.
決戰境外(jue-zhan-jing-wai): decisive battle outside of national boundary.
Republic of China Army
Aviation and Special Operation Command
高山低頭，海水讓路(gao-shan-di-tou, hai-shui-rang-lu): the mountain bows, the ocean gives way.
生為空特人，死為空特魂(sheng-wei-kong-te-ren, si-wei-kong-te-hun): live as kon-teh persons, die as kon-teh spirits.(空特kon-teh is abbreviation of Aviation and Special Warfare Command)
Republic of China Navy
忠、義(zhong, yi): loyalty and justice.
見敵必戰(jian-di-bi-zhan):  we must battle when enemy is in sight.
Republic of China Marine Corps
一日陸戰隊，終生陸戰隊(yi-ri-lu-zhan-dui, zhong-sheng-lu-zhan-dui):  Once a marine, always a marine.
不怕苦，不怕難，不怕死(bu-pa-ku, bu-pa-nan, bu-pa-si): fear no pain, fear no challenge, fear no death.
永遠忠誠(yong-yuan-zhong-cheng): always faithful (taken from the USMC motto semper fidelis)
Republic of China Air Force
無空防即無國防(wu-kong-fang-ji-wu-guo-fang): without air defense there is no national defense.
Republic of China Military Police
忠貞憲兵(zhong-zheng-xian-bing): loyal military police.
Military Academy
親愛精誠: Fraternity, Devotion, Sincerity
貪生怕死勿入此門，升官發財請走他路(tan-sheng-pa-si-mo-ru-ci-men, sheng-guan-fa-cai-qing-zou-ta-lu): (those who) covet life and fear death do not enter this door, (those who wish for) promotion and wealth please take other paths.

Czech Republic 

 601st Special Forces Group: Dokud dýchám, doufám (As long as I breathe, I hope)
 4th Rapid Deployment Brigade: Tam, kde jiní nestačí (Where others are not enough)
 43rd Parachute regiment: Pot šetří krev (Sweat saves blood)
 72nd mechanized battalion: Statečně bojovat, svobodně žít! (Fight bravely, live freely!)
 15th engineer regiment: Sloužíme, abychom pomáhali! (We serve to help!)
 53rd reconnaissance and electronic warfare regiment: Kdo zná, vítězí/Sciens vincit (Who knows, wins)

Estonia
  (Estonian Army)
  (Scouts Battalion):  (Latin for "out of many, one")

Finland
  (Finnish Army)
  (Armoured Brigade):  (Finnish for "strike and break through")
  (KYMJP):  (Finnish for "Blood and Steel")
  (Pori Brigade):  (Finnish for "honour, duty, will")
  (Utti Ranger Regiment):  (Latin for "higher")
  (Finnish Air Force):  (Latin for "quality is our strength")
  (Finnish Rapid Deployment Force):  (Finnish for "look good, do good!")

France
  (French Army):  (French for "honour and fatherland")
  (1st Parachute Hussar Regiment):  (Latin for "if you have lost everything, remember there is still honour")
  (1st Marine Infantry Parachute Regiment):  (French for "who dares wins")
  (2nd Marine Infantry Parachute Regiment):  (French for "do not suffer")
  (3rd Marine Infantry Parachute Regiment):  (French for "to be and to last")
  (2nd Marine Infantry Regiment):  (Latin for "loyalty and honour on land and sea")
  (3rd Marine Infantry Regiment):  (French for "The dead, get up")
  (12th Cuirassier Regiment):  (Latin for "amidst danger, they play")
  (2nd Dragoon Regiment):  (Latin for "give me a chance to shine")
  (13th Parachute Dragoon Regiment):  (French for "Beyond what is possible")
  (11th Marine Artillery Regiment):  (Latin for "the other terror after lightning")
  (35th Parachute Artillery Regiment):  (French for "Straight ahead")
  (French Foreign Legion):  (Latin for "the legion is our fatherland")
  (1st Foreign Cavalry Regiment):  (Latin for "not unequal to many")
  (1st Foreign Engineer Regiment):  (Latin for "to the end")
  (2nd Foreign Engineer Regiment):  (French for "nothing prevents")
  (2nd Foreign Infantry Regiment):  (French for "be ready")
  (2nd Foreign Parachute Regiment):  (Latin for "after the custom of our ancestors")
  (French Navy):  (French for "honour, fatherland, valour, discipline")
  (French Air and Space Force):  (French for "rise up")
  (Grand Army):  (French for "valour and discipline")

Germany 
  (German Armed Forces):  (German for "We. Serve. Germany.")
  (German Army):  (German for "protect, help, moderate, fight")
  (1st Panzer Division):  (Low German for "Let's go, let's tackle it!")
  (21st Panzer Brigade "Lipperland"):  (German for "ready for battle, to make peace")
  (10th Panzer Division):  (German for "reliable, mobile, fast!")
 I. German/Dutch Corps:  (Latin for "together we are strong")
  (Special Operations Division):  (German for "ready for action, anytime, worldwide!")
  (Deep Reconnaissance Company 200):  (Latin for "the eye of the army")
  (Special Forces Command):  (Latin for "the will is decisive")
  (Army Troops Brigade):  (Latin for "combined strength")
  (Airborne Engineers):  (German for "we move everything")
  (Army Aviation Corps):  (German for "without fear – forward!")
  (German Navy)
  (Combat Swimmers):  (German for "learn to suffer without complaining!")
  (German Air Force):  (German for "always on duty")
  (Protection Regiment of the Air Force "Friesland"):  (Latin for "always together")
  (Guard Battalion):  (Latin for "always the same")
  (Joint Medical Service):  (Latin for "humanity is the supreme law")

Greece 
  (Hellenic Army):  (Greek for "freedom stems from valour")
  (First Army):  (Greek for "as long as (the sun) follows its course")
  (I Army Corps):  (Greek for "come and get them")
  (II Army Corps):  (Ancient Greek for "either with it or on it")
  (1st Infantry Division):  (Greek for "(like the) wind")
  (1st Raider/Paratrooper Brigade):  (Greek for "who dares wins")
  (IV Army Corps):  (Greek for "solve the knot with the sword")
  (Hellenic Force in Cyprus):  (Greek for "the same blood and common language and common religion and common traditions")
  (Hellenic Navy):  (Greek for "great is the power of the sea")
  (Hellenic Air Force):  (Ancient Greek for "always dominate the heights")

India 
The mottoes of the Indian Armed Forces units come from Sanskrit or a regional language the specific unit is closely affiliated with. Some however are laurels won on the field and are in the language of the enemy or the commander's praise.

Indonesia 

Units within the Indonesian National Armed Forces have mottoes taken from Sanskrit, Old Javanese, and Indonesian language.

Israel 

 Israeli Defense Forces
Duvdevan:  Ki b'Tahbulot, Ta'ase-l'kha milhama (For by wise counsel thou shalt make thy war (Proverbs 24:6)).
 Givati Brigade:  Yehidat Sgula (A Unit of Virtue, also means: purple - the brigade's beret color)
 Israeli Armored Corps:  Ha-Adam She-ba-Tank Yenatze'ah (The Man in the Tank Shall Win)
 Israeli Armored Corps:  Ba-makom bo ya'atsru ha-zchalim, sham yikava ha gvool (In the Place where the [tank] Treads Stop, There the Border Will Be Decided [marked/drawn])
 Israeli Artillery Corps: Bli Siyua, Ha-chir Lo Yanua (Without Support, the Infantry Won't Move)
 Israeli Artillery Corps:  artilerya malkat Hakrav (Artillery is the Queen of Battle)
 Israeli Engineering Corps:  Rishonim Tamid (Always First)
 Israeli Engineering Corps Chemical Warfare Unit:  Hisardut ve Hemsech Lechima (Survival and continuous combat)
 Israeli Engineering Corps:  Et ha-Kashe Naase Hayom, Et ha-Bilti Efshari Naase Machar (The hard we shall do today, the impossible we shall do tomorrow)
 Israeli Education and Youth Corps:  Am boneh Tzava Boneh Am (A Folk builds An Army building a Folk)
 Israeli Intelligence Corps:  Lecha Dumiya Tehila (Silence is praise to You; Psalms 65:2)
 Israeli Medical Corps:  Ha-matsil nefesh achat, keilu hitsil olam shalem (He who saves one soul, it is as if he saves a whole world)
 Israeli Navy:  Vayerd MeYam Ad Yam, Uminahar Ad Afsey Aretz, Lefanav Yichreu Tziyim (He shall have dominion also from sea to sea, and from the river unto the ends of the earth. Navies shall bow before him;  Psalm 72:8,9)
 Nahal Brigade:  HaYitaron ha-Enoshi (The Human Advantage)
 Paratroopers Brigade:  Nizom, Novil, Ne'haveh Dugma VeNenaze'ah (We shall Innovate, Lead, Set an Example - and Win)
 Sayeret Matkal (General Staff Reconnaissance Unit):  Mi Sheme'ez, Menatze'ah (He Who Dares Wins)
 Shayetet 13:  She'hagalim mitchazkim, hachazakim mitgalim (When the waves grow stronger, the strong men are revealed).
 Mossad:  Be'ein Tachbulot Yipol Am, Uteshua Berov Yoetz (Where no counsel is, the people fall, but in the multitude of counselors there is safety; Proverbs 11:14)
 Shabak:  Magen Ve-Lo Yira'e (Defender Who Shall Not Have Fear / Defender Who Shall Not Be Seen)

Italy
  (Italian Army):  (Latin for "the safeguard of the republic shall be the supreme law")
  (Armoured Brigade Ariete):  (Italian for "iron mass, iron heart")
  (Mechanised Brigade Sassari):  (Sardinian for "our life for the fatherland")
  (Italian Navy):  (Italian for "country and honour")
  (Brigade of Saint Mark):  (Latin for "by sea, by land")
  (Coast Guard):  (Latin for "fortitude overcomes all difficulties")
  (Italian Air Force):  (Latin for "with valour to the stars")
  (Corps of Carabiniers):  (Italian for "faithful throughout the centuries")
  (Regiment of Cuirassiers):  (Latin for "courage becomes stronger in danger")
  (Financial Guard):  (Latin for "does not retreat even if broken")
  (State Police):  (Latin for "under the law, freedom")
  (Penitentiary Police):  (Latin for "to ensure hope is our role")
  (State Forestry Corps):  (Latin for "labour and vigilance for nature")
  (Fire Service):  (Latin for "we tame the flames, we give our hearts)
  (Military Corps of the Italian Red Cross):  (Latin for "in war, charity")
  (Military Corps of the Army of the Association of Italian Knights of the Sovereign Military Order of Malta):  (Latin for "strength and health")
  (Corps of Voluntary Nurses of the Association of Italian Knights of the Sovereign Military Order of Malta):  (Latin for "strength and health")
  (Military Ordinariate in Italy):  (Latin for "faith, charity, hope")

Korea, South
Korean Army: Power in Unity

3rd Infantry Division "White skull" : 살아도 백골, 죽어도 백골 (We are white skull. Dead or Alive)

Lebanon
 Lebanese Army:  Sharaf Tadhiya Wafaa (Honor, Sacrifice, Loyalty)
Lebanese Rangers:  Haith La Yajrae Alakhirown (Where no one dares)

Malaysia
Malaysian Army: Gagah Setia (Strong and Loyal)
 Royal Malay Regiment: Ta'at Setia (Loyal and True)
Royal Ranger Regiment: Agi Idup Agi Ngelaban (Whilst there is life, there is fight)
 1st Rangers
 2nd Rangers: Osiou oh Kamanang (Who Dares Wins in Kadazandusun)
 3rd Rangers: Biar Putih Tulang (Original proverb is "Biar putih tulang, Jangan putih mata", which roughly translates to "Better to die than to be a coward.")
 4th Rangers: Jadi Yang Terbaik (Be the Best)
 5th Rangers: Agi Idup Agi Ngelaban; previous Motto was Berjuang terus Berjuang (Keep on Fighting)
 6th Rangers
 7th Rangers (Mechanized): Cekal Perkasa (Determined and Strong)
 8th Rangers (Para)
 9th Rangers: Siau bani Manang (Who Dares Wins in Bajau)
 10th Rangers

Note: The 1st,5th,6th,8th and 10th Rangers uses the same motto, which is Agi Idup Agi Ngelaban.

Rejimen Sempadan (Border Regiment): Setia Waspada (Loyal and Alert)

Rejimen Artileri Diraja (Royal Artillery Regiment): Tangkas, Tegas, Saksama (Quick, Firm, Evan)

Rejimen Semboyan Diraja (Royal Signs Regiment): Pantas dan Pasti (Swift and Sure)

Kor Agama Angkatan Tentera (Religious Corps of the Armed Forces of Malaysia): Berjuang Berakhlak

Kor Armor DiRaja (Royal Armored Corps): Bersatu (United)
 2nd Regiment : Cari dan Jahanamkan (Seek and Destroy) and Second to None

Kor Risik DiRaja (Royal Intelligence Corps): Pintar dan Cergas (Intelligent and Active)

Royal Malaysian Navy:Sedia Berkorban (Ready to Sacrifice)

Royal Malaysian Air Force: Sentiasa di Angkasa Raya (Always in the Skies)

Myanmar
Defence Service ["Never Surrender"]

Netherlands
  (Royal Netherlands Army)
 I. German/Dutch Corps:  (Latin for "together we are strong")
  (11 Air Assault Brigade):  (Latin for "neither rashly nor timidly")
  (11 Air Defence Company Samarinda):  (Indonesian for "we stand for protection")
  (12 Regiment van Heutsz):  (Dutch for "it must, so it is possible")
  (13 Regiment Shock Troops Prince Bernhard):  (Dutch for "strong by conviction")
  (17 Guards Regiment Fusiliers Princess Irene):  (Latin for "I want it and I can do it")
  (Commando Corps):  (Latin for "now or never")
  (Royal Netherlands Navy)
  (Netherlands Marine Corps):  (Latin for "as far as the world extends")
 :  (Latin for "always ready for justice")
  (Royal Netherlands Air Force):  (Latin for "small in numbers, great in deeds")
 303 Squadron:  (Latin for "serving in danger")
 322 Squadron:  (Dutch for "don't talk, but do")
 334 Squadron:  (Latin for "always and everywhere")
 313 Squadron: Scherpgetand (Dutch for ''Sharp-toothed)
  (Royal Military Constabulary):  (Dutch for "without fear and without dishonour")

Norway
  (Norwegian Armed Forces): current:  (Norwegian for "For all we have. And all we are."); former:  (Norwegian for "For peace and freedom")
  (Norwegian Army): currently no motto for the Army, the same as Armed Forces are used.
  (2nd Battalion):  (Latin for "In this sign, thou shalt conquer")
  (6th Division):  (Norwegian for "Capability to fight – will for peace")
  (Artillery Battalion):  (Norwegian for "Do right, fear no one")
  (Battery N):  (Norwegian for "Brigade's killer bear")
  (Supply Battery):  (Latin for "Strength through unity")
  (Air Defense Battery):  (Latin for "First fire – Death from hell")
  (Cooperation Battery): (?) (Latin for "Victory together")
  (Combat Service Support Batallion):  (Latin for "Right the first time")
  (Garrison of Sør-Varanger)
  (Arctic Ranger Company):   (Latin for "We hunt in packs"); also:  (Latin for "We hunt in packs in the Arctic")
  (His Majesty The King's Guard):  (Norwegian for "Everything for the King!")
  (Army's Tactical Training Center):  (Norwegian for "Train for the worst – become the best")
  (Arm of Engineers):  (Latin for "Everywhere where right and glory lead")
  (Norwegian Military Academy):  (Latin for "If you want peace, prepare for war")
  (Armoured Battalion):  (Old Norse for "Strike first")
  (Armoured Squadron 2):  (Norwegian for "We're already there")
  (Mechanised Infantry Squadron 3):  (Latin for "Always ready")
  (Mechanised Infantry Squadron 4):  (Latin for "Wolverines to battle, continue forward")
  (Cavalry Squadron 5):  (Latin for "First in, last out")
  (Combat Service Support Squadron 6):  (Latin for "Willing and able")
  (Reconnaissance Squadron):  (Norwegian for "Sees all, always")
  (Remote Reconnaissance Squadron):  (Norwegian for "No respect for the distance")
  (Mortar Platoon):  (Latin for "Death from above")
  (Royal Norwegian Navy):  (Dano-Norwegian for "For King, country and the flag's honour")
  (Coastal Artillery):  (Norwegian for "Ready for battle")
  (Royal Norwegian Air Force):  (Norwegian for "King, people, and fatherland")
  (330 Squadron): current:  (Norwegian for "We save lives"); former:  (Norwegian for "Secure the sea")
  (Air Defence Artillery, battery 50M):  (Latin for "If it flies – it dies")
  (Norwegian Home Guard): current:  (Norwegian for "Everywhere – all the time"); former:  (Norwegian for "protects, guards, acts")

 (Norwegian Reserve Officers' Federation):  (Latin for "For the fatherland")

Former company in KFOR: Lead, don't follow

New Zealand 
 New Zealand Army

Royal New Zealand Air Force:  (Latin for "through adversity to the stars")

Pakistan 
 Pakistan Army (Urdu: پاک فوج) Motto (Urdu): Iman, Taqwa, Jihad fi Sabilillah (English translation: "Faith, Piety, Struggle for Allah")
 Pakistan Air Force (Urdu: پاک فضائیه) Motto (Persian): Sahrast ke daryast tah-e-bal-o-par-e-mast (English translation:- "Be it the deserts / Be it the rivers / All are under my wings")
 No. 9 Squadron: "How high you fly depends on how brave you are"
 No. 11 Squadron: "Your destination is beyond everyone else's destination"
 No. 14 Squadron: "Bold and fearless, endowed with undaunted spirit and great measure of heavenly might"
 Pakistan Navy (Urdu : پاک بحریہ) Motto (Arabic): (English translation: Allah (Alone) is Sufficient for us, and he is the Best Disposer of affairs) 
"A silent force to be reckoned with"
 Pakistan Marines (Urdu: پا مير ينز) Motto (Arabic): (English translation: "And hold fast to the rope of God and do not be divided")
 Pakistan Coast Guards Motto (English): Defending and Protecting what is Rightfully Ours)
Airport Security Forces Pakistan Motto (Urdu: ہر دم تیار) (English Translation: Always Ready)
 Pakistan Rangers (Urdu: پاکستان رینجرز) Motto (Urdu): داﯾمً ﺳﺎﮪرً Daaeman Saaheran (English translation: "Ever Vigil")

Philippines

Armed Forces of The Philippines
Armed Forces of The Philippines: "Protecting the People, Securing the State"
Philippine Army: "Serving the People, Securing the Land"
1st Infantry Division (Philippines): "Your Security, Our Mission, Community Development, Our Goal"
2nd Infantry Division (Philippines): "Advocates of Peace. Servants of the People. Defenders of Southern Tagalog"
3rd Infantry Division (Philippines): "Loved by the people, Feared by the Enemy"
5th Infantry Division (Philippines): "Only our best is good enough"
6th Infantry Division (Philippines): "Kampilan" ("Sword")
7th Infantry Division (Philippines): "Kaugnay" ("Ally")
9th Infantry Division (Philippines): "Second to None"
1st Scout Ranger Regiment: "We Strike"
Special Forces Regiment (Airborne): "Courage and Determination"
Light Reaction Regiment: "Tiradores de la Muerte" ("Sharpshooters of Death")
Army Artillery Regiment: "Rex Belli" ("King of Battle")
Philippine Navy: "Protecting the Seas, Securing our Future"
Philippine Marine Corps: Karangalan, Katungkulan, Kabayanihan ("Honor, Duty, Valour")
Philippine Air Force: "Guardians of our Precious skies, Bearers of Hope"

Portugal
 Portuguese Armed Forces: Que quem quis sempre pôde ("For those who wanted, always could") - from Os Lusíadas, Book IX, 95th Stanza.
 Portuguese Navy: Talent de bien faire (Old French for: "Talent of doing well") - motto of Henry the Navigator
 Marine Corps: Braço às armas feito ("Arms bearing Arms") — from Os Lusíadas, Book X, 155th Stanza.
 Portuguese Navy ships: A Pátria honrar que a Pátria vos contempla (Portuguese for: "Honor the Motherland, for the Motherland beholds you")
 Portuguese Army: Em perigos e guerras esforçados ("In ardous perils and wars") — from Os Lusíadas, Book I, 1st Stanza.
 Commandos: Audaces fortuna juvat (Latin for "Fortune favours the bold")
 Parachute Troops School: Que nunca por vencidos se conheçam ("May they never be found defeated") — from Os Lusíadas, Book VII, 71st Stanza.
 Special Operations Troops Centre: Que os muitos por ser poucos não temamos ("May we few not fear the many" - from Os Lusíadas, Book VIII, 36th Stanza.
 Portuguese Air Force: Ex mero motu (Latin for "From the mere motion")
 National Republican Guard: Pela lei e pela grei ("For the law and for the people")
 Public Security Police: Pela ordem e pela Pátria (Portuguese for "For order and for the Motherland")
 Special Operations Group (GOE): Última razão (Portuguese for "Last reason")

Romania
 Land Forces Academy "Nicolae Balcescu": "Mereu împreună" ("Always together")
 Romanian Army Special Forces: "Death dodges the brave ones"

Russia
 Russian Airborne Forces (VDV): "истина освободит вас" ("Truth is Freedom ")

Serbia
Serbian Special Forces Ко сме, тај може, ко не зна за страх, тај иде напред ("Who dares is able to, who knows no fear will move forward").

Singapore
Singapore Armed Forces/Singapore Army: Yang Pertama Dan Utama (Malay for "First and Foremost")
2nd People's Defence Force: Steadfast We Stand
3rd Division: Foremost and Utmost
6th Division: Swift and Deadly
9th Division/Infantry: Forging Ahead
Armour: Swift and Decisive
Army Deployment Force: Always Ready
Army Intelligence: First Line of Defence
Army Medical Services: Life First
Artillery: In Oriente Primus (Latin for "First in the East")
Combat Engineers: Advance and Overcome
Commandos: For Honour and Glory
Guards: Ready To Strike
Maintenance and Engineering Support: Excellence Through Professionalism
Military Police: Pride, Discipline, Honour
SAF Ammunition Command: The Heart of SAF's Firepower
Signals: Speed Through Skill
Supply/Transport: Reliable, Efficient, Professional
Republic of Singapore Navy: Beyond Horizons
Maritime Security Task Force: Frontline 24/7 
Naval Diving Unit: Nothing Stands In Our Way
Republic of Singapore Air Force: Above All
Air Combat Command: Poised and Deadly
Air Defence and Operations Command: Vigilant and Ready
Air Force Training Command: Excellence
Air Power Generation Command: Generate and Sustain
Participation Command: Integrate and Dominate
Unmanned Aerial Vehicle Command: Persistent and Precise
Basic Military Training Centre: Excel Through Basics
Officer Cadet School: To Lead, To Excel, To Overcome
SAF Medical Corps: To Seek, To Save, To Serve
SAF Volunteer Corps: Steadfast & Vigilant
Special Operations Force/Special Operations Task Force: We Dare
Specialist Cadet School: With Pride We Lead

South Africa
South African Army
South African Army Armoured Formation: Pectore Sicut Ferro (With a chest of steel)
1 South African Tank Regiment: We Make The Rules
1 Special Service Battalion: Eendrag Maak Mag (Unity is Strength)
South African Army Infantry Formation: Gladium Practamus (Wielders of the Sword)
1 Parachute Battalion: Ex alto vincimus (We conquer from Above)
6 South African Infantry Battalion: Aliis Melius
9 South African Infantry Battalion: Fortiter et fideliter (Boldly and faithfully)
South African Army Artillery Formation
4 Artillery Regiment (South Africa): Always in support
South African Air Force: Per aspera ad astra (English:Through hardships to the stars)
16 Squadron SAAF: "Hlaselani" (Attack)
South African Special Forces
4 Special Forces Regiment: Iron fist from the sea
5 Special Forces Regiment: We fear naught but God

Spain
Spanish Military: "Todo por la Patria" (Spanish for "Everything for the Motherland")

Sri Lanka
Military Unit Mottos: Sri Lanka
Special Task Force/Commando: Determined, dared, and done

Switzerland
 Infanterie Durchdiener Bataillon 14 und Schule:  (Latin for "Protector soldier")
 Kommando Spezialkräfte:  (Latin for "Honor,Unity, Modesty")
 Infanterie OS:  (Latin for "Leading by example")
 Inf Grenadiere:  (Latin for "Always faithful")
 Pz Aufklärer:  (Latin for "Seeing without being seen")
 Fallschirmaufklärer:  (Latin for "Rough paths lead to the stars")

Sweden
 Swedish Air Force
 Blekinge Wing:  (Swedish for "Strength through cooperation")
 Skaraborg Wing:  (Swedish for "Will, knowledge, honour")
 Uppland Wing:  (Latin for "Work, efficiency, satisfaction")
 Västmanland Wing:  (Latin for "Genom mödor mot stjärnorna")
 Swedish Army
 Artillery Regiment:  (Latin for "the last resort of kings")
 Göta Engineer Regiment:  (Latin for "I will find a way or create one")
 Jämtland Ranger Corps:  (Swedish for "For Sweden's honour, for Sweden's might, over mountain, over valley, the Jämtian rangers resound")
 Life Guards:  (Latin for "they can do what it seems they cannot")
 Life Regiment Hussars:  (Latin for "forward!")
 Air Defence Regiment:  (Latin for "we always reach our goals")
 Norrbotten Regiment:  (Swedish for "Never have they yielded, nor given ground")
 Norrland Engineer Company:  (Latin for "to us, nothing is impossible")
 Skaraborg Regiment:  (Swedish for "the heritage obligates")
 (42nd Mechanised Battalion):  (Latin for "together strong")
 (Kåkind Company):  (Swedish for "follow me")
 Västernorrland Regiment:  (Swedish for "For your country, your home region, your regiment")
 Swedish Navy
 1st Submarine Flotilla:  (Latin for "To be without being seen")
 4th Naval Warfare Flotilla:  (Latin for "Thoroughness and perseverance")
 Swedish Amphibious Corps
  (1st Amphibious Battalion):  (Latin for "simple principles")
  (2nd Amphibious Battalion):  (Latin for "vigilant everywhere")
  (3rd Amphibious Battalion):  (Latin for "brave, strong, and fast")
  (4th Amphibious Battalion):  (Latin for "victory")
  (5th Amphibious Battalion):  (Swedish for "strength and pride of the west coast")
  (6th Amphibious Battalion):  (Latin for "the first under the polar star")
  (Special Operations Task Group):  (Swedish for "forward through the night")

Tunisia
Tunisian Armed Forces
Groupe des Forces Spéciales (GFS) "الإنتصار أو إستشهاد Victory or martyrdom"

Ukraine 
 Ukrainian Naval Infantry:  (Ukrainian for "Always faithful!")
 Special Operations Forces:  (Ukrainian for "I Come at You!") 
 Kyiv Presidential Honor Guard Battalion:  (Latin for "Where there is unity, there is victory")
 93rd Mechanized Brigade:  (Latin for "Never Forgotten")
 79th Air Assault Brigade:  (Ukrainian for "In Unity is Power!") 
 95th Air Assault Brigade:  (Ukrainian for "Strength, Courage, Honor")
 128th Mountain Assault Brigade:  (Ukrainian for "For Ukraine, for its freedom.")

United Kingdom 
 British Army: Be the best (Unofficial), WW1- For king and Country
 Adjutant General's Corps:  (Latin for "determination and honesty")
 Army Medical Services
 Queen Alexandra's Royal Army Nursing Corps:  (Latin for "under the white cross")
 Royal Army Dental Corps:  (Latin for "from the teeth a sword")
 Royal Army Medical Corps:  (Latin for "faithful in adversity")
 Intelligence Corps:  (Latin for "knowledge gives strength to the arm")
 Parachute Regiment:  (Latin for "ready for anything")
 Royal Corps of Signals:  (Latin for "swift and sure")
 Royal Military Police:  (Latin for "by example, shall we lead")
 Special Air Service: Who dares wins
 The Rifles:  (Latin for "swift and bold")
 The Royal Regiment of Scotland:  (Latin for "No one provokes me with impunity")
 Territorial Force
 London Irish Rifles:  (Latin for "who shall separate us?")
 London Scottish: Strike sure
 Royal Navy:  (Latin for "if you wish for peace, prepare for war")
 Royal Navy Police:  (Latin for "do not give in to evil")
 Special Boat Service: By strength and guile
 Royal Marines:  (Latin for "by sea, by land")
 Royal Air Force:  (Latin for "through adversity to the stars")
 Royal Air Force Police:  (Latin for "let justice be done")

United States

Vietnam 
 Vietnam People's Army: Nothing is more precious than independence and freedom (Không có gì quý hơn độc lập tự do)
 Vietnam People's Ground Force: Determined to win (Quyết thắng)
 Vietnam People's Navy: Island is home, Sea is country (Đảo là nhà, Biển cả là quê hương)
 Vietnam People's Air Force:
 Vietnam Border Defense Force: Post is home, Border is country, Ethnic people are brothers (Đồn là nhà, Biên giới là quê hương, Đồng bào các dân tộc là anh em ruột thịt)
 Vietnam Coast Guard:
 Vietnam People's Public Security: Protect the security of the Fatherland (Bảo vệ an ninh Tổ quốc)
 Republic of Vietnam Military Forces (Military of the former government of South Vietnam from 1949 until the reunification in 1975):  The Fatherland - Honour  - Duty (Tổ Quốc - Danh dự - Trách nhiệm, Việt Nam Cộng Hoà).

See also
 List of university and college mottos

Notes

References

undaunted by hugh o'brien https://www.penguin.com.au/books/undaunted-9780857983497

Military mottos
Military